Johann IV, Count of Katzenelnbogen (c.1363 - 27 October 1444) was one of the last members of the younger line of the House of Katzenelnbogen.  He ruled the reunited County of Katzenelnbogen.

His father was  Diether VIII, a count of Katzenelnbogen from the younger line of the House of Katzenelnbogen, and ruled mainly in Upper Katzenelnbogen.  Johann's mother was Elisabeth, a daughter of Adolph I of Nassau-Wiesbaden (1307–1370).

In 1383, Johann IV married Anna of Katzenelnbogen, a distant cousin from the older line of Katzenelnbogen, and they had at least one son: Philipp I (1402–1479).  Philipp I was the last male member of the House of Katzenelnbogen.  He had two sons: Philipp II (1427–1453) and Eberhard (d. 1456), however, they both predeceased him.  After Philipp I's death, his daughter Anna inherited the County, including Dornberg Castle, and so it fell to her husband, Henry III, Landgrave of Upper Hesse.

Johann was important in the history of Riesling.  In 1435 Klaus Kleinfisch, an administrator of Johann, bought a new white grape variety from a vineyard in Rüsselsheim for 22 shillings. In this invoice, the name Riesling is mentioned for the first time in a document.

Johann died 27 October 1444 at Rheinfels Castle.  His body was later transferred to Eberbach Abbey, which had been the family's burial site since Eberhard I of Katzenelnbogen.

Ancestry

References

External links
http://www.gg-online.de/html/dornberger_schloss.htm
http://www.gross-gerau.de/images/bgi/dld/Meilensteine_02-10-2008_17-42-42.pdf

Counts of Katzenelnbogen
14th-century births
1444 deaths